Dark Matters is the ninth album by the Finnish rock band The Rasmus, which was released in Finland on 8 October 2017. It is their first album after five years of inactivity, as a continuation of their previous album The Rasmus (2012).

The album is characterized by the musical genres that predominate in the songs, between electropop and electronic rock, although they preserve their classic style of alternative rock.

Background
Dark Matters is The Rasmus's first album in eight years to be released by Playground Music, after Best of The Rasmus 2001–2009. The album was originally announced for a 22 September release, but was delayed to 2 October. Singer Lauri Ylönen has commented that "The idea behind the new songs was to make the kind of music that we ourselves would like to hear, we have not forgotten the Nordic melancholy, but also, our new songs have a great number of influences." Dark Matters is like a roller and roller coaster with many different themes and personal feelings. "

A music video for "Wonderman" was directed by Jesse Haaja and premiered on YouTube on 26 September 2017.

On 1 December, of the same year the official video of "Silver Night" directed by Vesa Manninen was released, in which they show us a solitary robot in a house. It is the first official video where the members of the band do not appear.

On 26 January 2018, a new official video of The Rasmus is released: "Nothing", which was directed by the bassist of the group Eero Heinonen.

During the tour of the group in Russia in March of this year, the band is filming a new official video, this time for the song "Empire".

Track listing

Personnel 
The Rasmus
 Lauri Ylönen – Vocals
 Eero Heinonen – Bass
 Pauli Rantasalmi – Guitar
 Aki Hakala – Drums

References

The Rasmus albums
2017 albums